Thomas G. Weiss (born 1946) is a distinguished international diplomat and scholar of international relations and global governance with special expertise in the politics of the United Nations, where he himself served in various high-ranking roles. He was named a 2016 Andrew Carnegie Fellow for a project exploring the concept of a world without the United Nations. Since 1998, he has been Presidential Professor at the Graduate Center of the City University of New York, and is Director Emeritus of the Ralph Bunche Institute for International Studies. At present, he also is Co-Chair, Cultural Heritage at Risk Project, J. Paul Getty Trust; Distinguished Fellow, Global Governance, The Chicago Council on Global Affairs; Global Eminence Scholar, Kyung Hee University, Seoul. In his spare time, he is a wood sculptor.

He is "one of the leading experts on the theory and practice of humanitarian intervention," and is recognized as an authority on international organizations and the UN system. Weiss adheres to the constructivist school, and advocates a position for intergovernmental organizations that goes beyond the anarchy of inter-state relations. He initiated the UN Intellectual History Project in 1999 to trace the origins and the evolution of key ideas about international economic and social development nurtured under UN auspices. Weiss conceived the "Third United Nations," and directed the research team that popularized the concept of Responsibility to Protect (R2P). A firm believer in R2P, Weiss has argued in numerous works that a well-grounded interpretation of sovereignty does not preclude intervention in the face of mass atrocities. His oral history transcript is available on the UN Intellectual History Project website.

Biography 

Weiss received his BA from Harvard University and both his MA and PhD from Princeton University. He pursued advanced studies at the Graduate Institute of International Studies, Geneva. He held professional posts in the Office of the UN Commissioner for Namibia, the University Program at the Institute for World Order, the United Nations Institute for Training and Research, and the International Labour Organization. He served as a Senior Economic Affairs Officer at the United Nations Conference on Trade and Development in Geneva from 1975 until 1985.

After leaving UNCTAD, he became Executive Director of the International Peace Academy (now the International Peace Institute), until he left in 1989 to become Research Professor at Brown University and Associate Director of their Watson Institute for International and Public Affairs. He was also Executive Director of the Academic Council on the United Nations System (ACUNS) from 1992 and 1998, and co-director of the Humanitarianism and War Project. From 2012 to 2015, he was a Visiting Research Professor at SOAS, University of London.

Weiss was director of the Ralph Bunche Institute for International Studies from 2001 to 2014. For over forty years he has regularly taught, lectured, consulted on, and conducted research on a wide variety of issues in international relations.

Contributions

He served as an advisory board member for the Global Centre for the Responsibility to Protect from 2007-2014 and sits on the editorial boards of Journal of Intervention and Statebuilding, Third World Quarterly, Global Governance, and Global Responsibility to Protect. He is, along with Rorden Wilkinson, co-editor of Routledge's "Global Institutions Series." His prior positions include:

 Director of the United Nations Intellectual History Project, with Louis Emmerij and Richard Jolly, 1999-2010. In addition to overseeing seventeen volumes and 80 oral histories of ideas in the United Nations, the three directors notably introduced the idea that there are "three United Nations."
 Research Director of the International Commission on Intervention and State Sovereignty, 2000-2002. This initiative popularized the concept of the "responsibility to protect," and Weiss co-authored the supplementary volume—which traced the ethics, assessed the operational mechanics, and analyzed the political dimensions of the undertaking—that accompanied the final report of the commission.
 President of the International Studies Association, the preeminent professional association of scholars of international politics, 2009–2010, and recipient of its 2016 International Organization Distinguished Scholar Award.
 Chair of the Academic Council on the United Nations System, 2007-2009.
 Editor, Global Governance, 2000-2005.
 Director of The Future United Development Systems Project, with Stephen Browne, 2011-2017.
 Director of the Wartime United Nations Project, with Dan Plesch, 2011-2015.

Academic work 

Weiss has authored or edited some 60 books and 275 articles and book chapters. His research interests focus primarily on the United Nations, global governance, humanitarianism, human rights, the Responsibility to Protect doctrine, and the power of ideas in shaping world order. Weiss's books from the 21st century include (most recent editions are listed):
 Weiss, Thomas G. and James Cuno, eds. (2022). Cultural Heritage and Mass Atrocities [Getty Publications] https://www.getty.edu/publications/cultural-heritage-mass-atrocities/.
 Weiss, Thomas G. and Rorden Wilkinson, eds. (2021). Global Governance Futures [Routledge] https://www.routledge.com/Global-Governance-Futures/Weiss-Wilkinson/p/book/9780367689735.
 Weiss, Thomas G. and Tatiana Carayannis (2021). The “Third” United Nations: How a Knowledge Ecology Helps the UN Think [Oxford] https://global.oup.com/academic/product/the-third-united-nations-9780198855859?q=carayannis&lang=en&cc=us
Weiss, Thomas G. and Stephen Browne, eds. (2021). Routledge Handbook on the UN and Development [Routledge] https://www.routledge.com/Routledge-Handbook-on-the-UN-and-Development/Browne-Weiss/p/book/9780367186852
 Weiss, Thomas G. and Rorden Wilkinson (2019). "Rethinking Global Governance" [Polity Press]. http://politybooks.com/bookdetail/?isbn=9781509527236
 Weiss, Thomas G. and Sam Daws, eds. (2018). "The Oxford Handbook on the UN" Second Edition [Oxford Press]. https://global.oup.com/academic/product/the-oxford-handbook-on-the-united-nations-9780198803164?q=weiss%20daws&lang=en&cc=gb# 
Weiss, Thomas G. (2018). "Would the World Be Better without the UN?" [Polity]. ,http://politybooks.com/bookdetail/?isbn=9781509517251
 Weiss, Thomas G. and Rorden Wilkinson, eds. (2018). International Organization and Global Governance, Second Edition [Routledge], ,https://www.routledge.com/International-Organization-and-Global-Governance-2nd-Edition/Weiss-Wilkinson/p/book/9781138236585. 
 Weiss, Thomas G. and Danielle Zach, eds. (2018). 70 Years of the United Nations in International Affairs: United Nations Virtual Issue, an online compendium of International Affairs, available at https://academic.oup.com/ia/pages/united_nations 
 Weiss, Thomas G.; Hoffman, Peter J. (2018) "Humanitarianism, War, and Politics" First Edition [Rowman & Littlefield], https://rowman.com/ISBN/9781442266131/Humanitarianism-War-and-Politics-Solferino-to-Syria-and-Beyond 
 Weiss, Thomas G.; Roy, Pallavi, eds. (2017) "The UN and the Global South, 1945 and 2015", First Edition [Routledge], https://www.routledge.com/The-UN-and-the-Global-South-1945-and-2015/Weiss-Roy/p/book/9781138222922 
 Weiss, Thomas G.; Forsythe, David P.; Coate, Roger; Kelly-Kate Pease (2017), The United Nations and Changing World Politics, Eighth Edition, [Westview Press],  https://westviewpress.com/books/the-united-nations-and-changing-world-politics/. 
 Weiss, Thomas G. (2016), What's Wrong With the United Nations and How to Fix It, Third Edition, [Wiley], http://www.wiley.com/WileyCDA/WileyTitle/productCd-1509507434.html.
 Weiss, Thomas G. (2016), Humanitarian Intervention: Ideas in Action, Third Edition, [Polity Press], http://www.polity.co.uk/book.asp?ref=9780745659800.
 Weiss, Thomas G.; Abdenur, Adriana Erthal, eds. (2016), Emerging Powers and the UN: What Kind of Development Partnership?, [Routledge], https://www.routledge.com/products/9781138947320.
 Plesch, Dan; Weiss, Thomas G., eds. (2015), Wartime Origins and The Future United Nations, [Routledge], http://www.sponpress.com/books/details/9780415712675/. For interview see https://soundcloud.com/siriusxm-news-issues/thomas-weiss-wartime-origins-and-the-future-united-nations.
 Weiss, Thomas G. Governing the World? Addressing "Problems without Passports" (2014), [Paradigm], http://www.paradigmpublishers.com/Books/BookDetail.aspx?productID=393776
 Weiss, Thomas G.; Browne, Stephen, eds. (2014), Post-2015 UN Development: Making change happen [Routledge], http://www.routledge.com/books/details/9780415856638/.
 Weiss, Thomas G.; Serrano, Monica, eds. (2014),The International Politics of Human Rights: Rallying to the R2P C-use? [Routledge], http://www.routledge.com/books/details/9780415626347/. 
 Weiss, Thomas G.; Wilkinson, Rorden, eds. (2014), International Organization and Global Governance, [Routledge], .
 Weiss, Thomas G. (2013), Global Governance: Why? What? Whither, [Polity Press], http://www.polity.co.uk/book.asp?ref=9780745660455. 
 Weiss, Thomas G. (2013), Humanitarian Business, [Polity Press], http://www.polity.co.uk/book.asp?ref=9780745663319.
 Barnett, Michael; Weiss, Thomas G. (2011), Humanitarianism Contested: Where Angels Fear to Tread, [Routledge], http://www.routledge.com/books/details/9780415496643/. 
 Mani, Rama; Weiss, Thomas G., eds. (2011), Responsibility to Protect: Cultural Perspectives in the Global South, Routledge, http://www.routledge.com/books/details/9780415781855/. 
 Weiss, Thomas G. (2011), Thinking about Global Governance, Why People and Ideas Matter, Routledge, http://www.routledge.com/books/details/9780415781930/.
 Weiss, Thomas G.; Thakur, Ramesh (2010), Global Governance and the UN: An Unfinished Journey, Indiana University Press, http://www.iupress.indiana.edu/product_info.php?products_id=145358. 
 Boulden, Jane; Thakur, Ramesh; Weiss, Thomas G., eds. (2009), The United Nations and Nuclear Orders, [United Nations University Press], https://unp.un.org/bookshop/details.aspx?sku=9789280811674. 
 Jolly, Richard; Emmerij, Louis; and Weiss, Thomas G. (2009), UN Ideas That Changed the World, [Indiana University Press], http://www.iupress.indiana.edu/product_info.php?products_id=95548. 
 Barnett, Michael; Weiss, Thomas G., eds. (2008), Humanitarianism in Question: Politics, Power, Ethics, [Cornell University Press], http://www.cornellpress.cornell.edu/book/?GCOI=80140100666490.
 Weiss, Thomas G.; Daws, Sam, eds. (2007), The Oxford Handbook on the United Nations [Oxford University Press], http://www.oxfordhandbooks.com/view/10.1093/oxfordhb/9780199560103.001.0001/oxfordhb-9780199560103.
 Weiss, Thomas G.; with Korn, David A. (2006) Internal Displacement: Conceptualization and Its Consequences, Routledge, http://www.routledge.com/books/details/9780415770798/.
 Hoffman, Peter J.; Weiss, Thomas G. (2006), Sword & Salve: Confronting New Wars and Humanitarian Crises, [Rowman & Littlefield], .
 Weiss, Thomas G. (2004), Military-Civilian Interactions: Humanitarian Crises and the Responsibility to Protect, Second Edition, Rowman & Littlefield, .
 Weiss, Thomas G.; Caryannis, Tatiana; Emmerij, Louis; and Jolly, Richard (2005), UN Voices: The Struggle for Development and Social Justice, [Indiana University Press], http://www.iupress.indiana.edu/product_info.php?products_id=22228.
 Weiss, Thomas G., Crahan, Margaret E.; Goering, John, eds. (2004), Wars on Terrorism and Iraq: Human Rights, Unilateralism, and U.S. Foreign Policy, [Routledge], http://www.routledge.com/books/details/9780415700634/.
 Boulden, Jane; Weiss, Thomas G., eds. (2004), Terrorism and the UN: Before and After September 11, Indiana University Press, http://www.iupress.indiana.edu/product_info.php?products_id=21665.
 Weiss, Thomas G., Hubert, Don (2002) The Responsibility to Protect: Research, Bibliography, Background, [International Development Research Centre], http://web.idrc.ca/en/ev-9439-201-1-DO_TOPIC.html.
 Louis Emmerij; Jolly, Richard; and Weiss, Thomas G. (2001), Ahead of the Curve?: UN Ideas and Global Challenges, [Indiana University Press], http://www.iupress.indiana.edu/product_info.php?products_id=21187.
 Aall, Pamela; Miltenberger, Daniel; Weiss, Thomas G. (2000), Guide to IGOs, NGOs, and the Military in Peace and Relief Operations, [US Institute of Peace], .

 Lectures, talks, and interviews 
 Thomas G. Weiss presentation of his new book "Would the World Be Better without the UN?" followed by Q&A, from the Korean Foundation for Advanced Studies http://ralphbuncheinstitute.org/2018/06/11/thomas-weiss-on-his-new-book-would-the-world-be-better-without-the-un/
 The new UN Secretary General faces harrowing challenges: an interview with The Wall Street Journal: https://www.wsj.com/video/new-un-secretary-general-faces-harrowing-challenges/C8EF89CA-1B1C-4EE6-AAD1-24D9F0091127.html
 In November 2016, the semi-annual publication of the entire City University of New York System was devoted to faculty award recipients. "Salute to Scholars" featured him and the award on pp. 56–57, also available at http://www2.cuny.edu/wp-content/uploads/sites/4/page-assets/news/publications/includes/salute-to-scholars/Salute-to-Scholars-Faculty-Awards-2016.pdf.
 "As UN Secretary General, Ban Ki-moon is toward the Bottom", The Hankyoreh'', 20 June 2016, http://english.hani.co.kr/arti/english_edition/e_international/748952.html.
 Thomas G. Weiss and Stephen Browne wrote for MUNPlanet about the challenges that lay ahead the post-2015 development agenda. Whither Post-2015 UN Development?
 "United Nations is very cost-effective", SNBC, 18 November 2015, http://video.cnbc.com/gallery/?video=3000456012.  
 "Humanitarian Business", Center for Global Ethics and Politics, 20 February 2014, http://cgep.ws.gc.cuny.edu/cgep-video/thomas-g-weiss/. 
 ISA's Presidents Series, International Studies Association, 2010, http://www.isanet.org/Programs/PRC/Short-Term-Release-2.

References

External links 
Thomas G. Weiss and Roden Wilkinson's article "Rethinking Global Governance? Complexity, Authority, Power, Change" was the most cited piece in International Studies Quarterly
 Thomas G. Weiss's faculty profile at  City University of New York. 
 The United Nations Intellectual History Project website
 The FP Survey: The United Nations, "an exclusive poll of top experts" that includes Thomas G. Weiss
 SOAS, University of London, Centre for International Studies and Diplomacy (CISD)
 Future United Nations Development System (FUNDS) Project

Living people
1946 births
International relations scholars
Princeton University alumni
Harvard University alumni
Graduate Institute of International and Development Studies alumni
Brown University faculty
American officials of the United Nations